Tommy Robredo was the defending champion but retired in the first round against Maxime Janvier.

Roberto Carballés Baena won the title after defeating Facundo Bagnis 2–6, 7–6(7–5), 6–1 in the final.

Seeds
All seeds receive a bye into the second round.

Draw

Finals

Top half

Section 1

Section 2

Bottom half

Section 3

Section 4

References

External links
Main Draw
Qualifying Draw

Singles